Banni is a village in the Mirpur Tehsil of Mirpur District of Azad Kashmir, Pakistan.

Demography 

According to 1998 census of Kashmir, its population was 1,389.

References 

Populated places in Mirpur District